Bom-Crioulo: The Black Man and the Cabin Boy is a novel by the Brazilian writer Adolfo Caminha, first published in 1895. An English translation by E.A. Lacey was published in 1982 by Gay Sunshine.

The novel, whose narrative follows the character Amaro, an ex-slave who works for the Navy and who, at a given moment, falls in love with the young cabin boy Aleixo, was the first major literary work on homosexuality to be published in Brazil, and one of the first to have a black person as its hero. The novel caused a stir upon its publication but was almost forgotten in the first half of the 20th century. In the second half of the 20th century, the novel has been republished several times in Brazil and translated into English, Spanish, German, French and Italian.

While many view the novel as a positive example of social progress in Brazil, it is widely regarded as propaganda with a central message declaring "não há lugar para a existência do negro e do homossexual que não o gueto ou a morte", which in English means "there is no place for the existence of the black man nor the homosexual if not the ghetto or in death".

References

 Braga-Pinto, César . Othello's Pathologies: reading Adolfo Caminha with Lombroso. Comparative Literature 66:2 doi 10.1215/00104124-2682173 © 2014 by University of Oregon. read full article
 Robert Howes Race and Transgressive Sexuality in Adolfo Caminha's "Bom-Crioulo", Luso-Brazilian Review, Vol. 38, No. 1. (Summer, 2001), pp. 41–62.

External links

 Bom-Crioulo  

1890s novels
1890s LGBT novels
1895 novels
Brazilian LGBT novels
Gay male romance novels
LGBT in Brazil
Naturalist novels
Novels with bisexual themes
Novels with gay themes